HMS Somali was a  destroyer of the British Royal Navy that saw service in World War II. She was launched in 1937, captured the first prize of World War II and served in Home and Mediterranean waters.  She was torpedoed on 20 September 1942 in the Arctic and foundered five days later while under tow.

Description
The Tribals were intended to counter the large destroyers being built abroad and to improve the firepower of the existing destroyer flotillas and were thus significantly larger and more heavily armed than the preceding . The destroyers were powered by two Parsons geared steam turbines, each driving one propeller shaft using steam provided by three Admiralty three-drum boilers. The ships' complement consisted of 190 officers and ratings, although the flotilla leaders carried an extra 20 officers and men consisting of the Captain (D) and his staff.

The primary armament of the Tribal-class destroyers was eight quick-firing (QF) 4.7-inch (120 mm) Mark XII guns in four superfiring twin-gun mounts, one pair each fore and aft of the superstructure, designated 'A', 'B', 'X', and 'Y' from front to rear. The mounts had a maximum elevation of 40°. For anti-aircraft (AA) defence, they carried a single quadruple mount for the  QF two-pounder Mk II "pom-pom" gun and two quadruple mounts for the 0.5-inch (12.7 mm) Mark III machine gun. Low-angle fire for the main guns was controlled by the director-control tower (DCT) on the bridge roof that fed data acquired by it and the  rangefinder on the Mk II Rangefinder/Director directly aft of the DCT to an analogue mechanical computer, the Mk I Admiralty Fire Control Clock. Anti-aircraft fire for the main guns was controlled by the Rangefinder/Director which sent data to the mechanical Fuze Keeping Clock.

The ships were fitted with a single above-water quadruple mount for  torpedoes. The Tribals were not intended as anti-submarine ships, but they were provided with ASDIC, one depth charge rack and two throwers for self-defence, although the throwers were not mounted in all ships; Twenty depth charges was the peacetime allotment, but this increased to 30 during wartime.

Wartime modifications
Heavy losses to German air attack during the Norwegian Campaign  demonstrated the ineffectiveness of the Tribals' anti-aircraft suite and the RN decided in May 1940 to replace 'X' mount with two QF  Mark XVI dual-purpose guns in a twin-gun mount. To better control the guns, the existing rangefinder/director was modified to accept a Type 285 gunnery radar as they became available. The number of depth charges was increased to 46 early in the war, and still more were added later. To increase the firing arcs of the AA guns, the rear funnel was shortened and the mainmast was reduced to a short pole mast.

Construction and career 
Authorized as one of nine Tribal-class destroyers under the 1936 Naval Estimates, Somali has been the only ship of her name to serve in the Royal Navy. The ship was ordered on 19 June 1936 from Swan Hunter & Wigham Richardson and was laid down on 27 August at the company's Wallsend, Tyne and Wear, shipyard. launched on 24 August 1937, Somali was completed on 7 December 1938 and commissioned five days later. The ship cost £340,095 which excluded weapons and communications outfits furnished by the Admiralty.

On 3 September 1939, Somali intercepted the German freighter , 350 miles south of Iceland, and took her as a prize. This was the first enemy merchant ship to be captured during the war.

On 15 May 1940, during the Norwegian Campaign, Somali was carrying Brigadier the Hon. William Fraser, commander of 24th Guards Brigade, back to Harstad from a reconnaissance of Mo when she was bombed by German aircraft and forced to return to the United Kingdom for repairs, taking the Brigadier with her. He did not reach Harstad until 23 May.  On 23 October,  and Somali shelled and sank  in the Norwegian Sea off Stadlandet, Norway.

Somali was the leader of the 6th Destroyer Flotilla and spent most of the winter of 1940–41 screening Home Fleet sweeps. In May 1941, Somali boarded the German weather ship München. Prior to being boarded, the crew of München threw overboard the ship's Enigma machine in a weighted bag. However, documents on the operation of the Enigma machine were left on board, as were vital codebooks providing a breakthrough for Allied codebreakers.

On 13 August 1942, Somali rescued all 105 crew of the American cargo ship , which had been torpedoed by E boats while taking part in Operation Pedestal. The rescued crew were landed at Gibraltar.

Fate
Lieutenant Commander Colin Maud took over as captain in September 1942 when her own captain, Jack Eaton, was ill. On 20 September 1942 Somali was torpedoed by  while covering Convoy QP 14 during the Russian convoys. She was hit in her engine room, and although taken under tow by the destroyer , she sank on 25 September, after heavy weather broke her back. Of the 102 men on board, only 35 were rescued from the Arctic waters. Leading Seaman Goad of Ashanti was awarded the Albert Medal for "great bravery in saving life at sea" after diving into the freezing water to save Lieutenant Commander Maud.

Somali was the last Royal Navy Tribal-class destroyer to be sunk during the war.

Notes

References
 
 
 
 
 
 
 
 
 
 T.K. Derry, History of the Second World War: The Campaign in Norway, London: HM Stationery Office, 1952.

External links
HMS Somali at U-boat.net

 

Tribal-class destroyers (1936) of the Royal Navy
Ships built by Swan Hunter
Ships built on the River Tyne
1937 ships
World War II destroyers of the United Kingdom
Ships sunk by German submarines in World War II
Shipwrecks in the Arctic Ocean
Maritime incidents in September 1942